Deonte Banks is an American football cornerback for the Maryland Terrapins.

Early life
Banks went to Edgewood High School.

College career 
Banks committed to play college football at the University of Maryland, College Park. As a freshman, he recorded 28 tackles, an interception, and two pass breakups. Maryland only played five games in 2020 due to the COVID-19 pandemic, with Banks recording 11 tackles and a pass breakup. In 2021, Banks suffered a season-ending shoulder injury in the second game of the year. In 2022, he had 26 tackles, an interception, and a blocked extra point. Banks declared for the 2023 NFL Draft following the season. In January 2023, he was invited to participate in the 2023 NFL Combine.

Professional Career
Banks went into the NFL Combine on the second day with the DB's along with teammate Jakorian Bennett.

His forty time was the 3rd best among DBs only behind DJ Turner (4.26s) and teammate Jakorian Bennett (4.31)

References

External links

Maryland Terrapins bio

Living people
Maryland Terrapins football players
Players of American football from Baltimore
Year of birth missing (living people)
American football cornerbacks